Eline Vere  is a 1991 Dutch film directed by Harry Kümel, based on the 1889 novel with the same title by Louis Couperus. The film was selected as the Dutch entry for the Best Foreign Language Film at the 64th Academy Awards, but was not accepted as a nominee.

Cast
Marianne Basler	... 	Eline Vere
Monique van de Ven	... 	Betsy van Raat
Johan Leysen	... 	Henk van Raat
Thom Hoffman	... 	Vincent Vere
Paul Anrieu	... 	Oom Daniél
Aurore Clément	... 	Tante Elise
Bernard Kruysen	... 	Theo Fabrice
Michael York	... 	Lawrence St. Clare
Mary Dresselhuys	... 	Mevrouw van Raat
Koen De Bouw	... 	Paul van Raat
Miryanna van Reeden	... 	Jeanne Ferelijn (as Miryanna Boom)
Herman Gilis... 	Otto van Erlevoort
Karen van Parijs	... 	Frederique van Erlevoort
Alexandra van Marken	... 	Emile de Weerde van Bergh
Michael Pas	... 	George de Weerde van Bergh
Ragnhild Rikkelman	... 	Lille Verstraeten

See also
 List of submissions to the 64th Academy Awards for Best Foreign Language Film
 List of Dutch submissions for the Academy Award for Best Foreign Language Film

References

External links
 

1991 films
Dutch drama films
1990s Dutch-language films
Films based on Dutch novels
Films set in the 1880s
Films set in the Netherlands
Films shot in the Netherlands
Films directed by Harry Kümel
Golan-Globus films
1991 drama films